GB, or Gb may refer to:

Places

 United Kingdom (ISO 3166-1 code), a sovereign country situated off the north-western coast of continental Europe
 Great Britain, an island situated off the north-western coast of continental Europe
 Kingdom of Great Britain (1707–1800), a predecessor country of the United Kingdom
 Gilgit-Baltistan, a region in northern Pakistan
 Guinea-Bissau, a sovereign state in West Africa
 Green Bay, Wisconsin, United States
 Great Barrington, Massachusetts, United States

Businesses and organisations
 GB Airways, a British airline
 Gardner Bender, a manufacturer of professional electrician's tools and supplies
 Girls' Brigade, a Christian organization for girls
 Grande Bibliothèque, a large public library in Montreal
 University of Wisconsin–Green Bay, an American university
 ABX Air (IATA airline designator GB), a cargo airline
 GB Glace, a Swedish ice cream company
 Griesedieck Brothers beer, an American beer brand
 GB Supermarkets, a Belgian chain that was eventually taken over by Carrefour
 GB News, a British television news channel

Science and technology

Computing and electronics
 Gigabit (Gb), a unit of information used, for example, to quantify computer memory or storage capacity
 Gigabyte (GB), a unit of information used, for example, to quantify computer memory or storage capacity
 Gain–bandwidth product, product of amplifier midband gain and bandwidth
 Game Boy, a handheld video game console
 Guobiao standards, Chinese National Standards
 GB 2312, an encoding scheme for rendering Simplified Chinese characters
 GB 18030, an encoding scheme for rendering Simplified Chinese characters

Military technology
 Beechcraft GB Traveler, U.S. Navy aircraft
 Steyr GB, an Austrian semi-automatic handgun
 Sarin (NATO designation GB), a nerve gas
 GB-1, a World War II American glide bomb

Other uses in science and technology
 Ganglion blocker, a medication
 Gigabase (Gb), a unit of length for DNA
 Gilbert (unit) (Gb), a unit of magnetization named for English physicist William Gilbert
 Government and binding theory, in linguistics, by Noam Chomsky
 Guillain–Barré syndrome, an acute inflammatory polyneuropathy

Sport
 Great Britain at the Olympics, the Olympic team of the United Kingdom
 Green Bay Packers, an American football team
 Games behind, a number reflecting the gap between two sports teams

People
 GB (footballer), (full name Gabriel Souza da Silva), Brazilian association footballer

Other uses
 Gb (digraph), a digraph in the Latin alphabet
 Voiced labial–velar plosive, a consonant sound transcribed as 
 G♭ (musical note), a semitone
 G-flat major, a key
 Group buy, buying something as a collective
 Gazerbeam, a fictional deceased superhero in the animated film The Incredibles

See also
 BG (disambiguation)
 Gigabyte (disambiguation)
 GBS (disambiguation)